Daniel McConchie is a Republican member of the Illinois Senate. He represents the 26th Senate District which includes Algonquin, Barrington, Cary, Deer Park, Fox River Grove, Hawthorn Woods, Hoffman Estates, Island Lake, Kildeer, Lake Zurich, Libertyville, Long Grove, Mundelein, and Wauconda.

Early life, education and military service
At age nine, McConchie went door-to-door to his neighbors offering to do odd jobs. He started his first business when he was 15 years old and a second one while in college.

McConchie joined the Illinois Army National Guard on his 17th birthday, and he served in the Guard for nine years as an infantryman and a military policeman.

McConchie holds a bachelor's degree from Central Bible College in Springfield, Missouri, and a master's degree from Trinity Evangelical Divinity School in Deerfield, Illinois.

Career
Prior to his campaign for and subsequent appointment to the Illinois Senate, McConchie served as Vice President for Americans United for Life. In the years prior to his first campaign, McConchie had been asked to run for public office but declined.

McConchie is the senior advisor for the Public Sector division at The Shelby Group, a company that works to optimize procurement operations. He serves on the Board of Regents for The Fund for American Studies, an international group that trains young people in leadership, and also serves on the Board of Directors of Informed Choices Pregnancy & Parenting.

Illinois Senate
After originally running for the Illinois House of Representatives, McConchie announced he would run to replace Dan Duffy for 26th Senate District after the latter announced that he would be retiring. He defeated two other candidates in the March 15, 2016 primary election, winning 36.6% of the vote to opponent Casey Urlacher's 32.8% and Martin McLaughlin's 30.6%. In April 2016, McConchie was subsequently appointed to the district after Duffy chose to retire early, and he opened his Senate office on July 27, 2016. In the 2016 general election, McConchie defeated Democratic challenger Kelly Mazeski with over 59 percent of the vote.

On November 5, 2020, McConchie was selected as Senate Republican Leader-elect for the 102nd General Assembly, and he was confirmed to the position on January 13, 2021. On November 15, 2022, shortly after the 2022 Illinois Senate election, McConchie was not re-elected by his caucus to serve as the Illinois Senate Minority Leader. He was succeeded by John Curran.

Committees
McConchie is currently assigned to the Executive Committee; Redistricting; Redistricting- Chicago North (Sub-Minority Spokesperson); Redistricting- Chicago Northwest (Sub-Minority Spokesperson); Redistricting- Chi. West and W Cook (Sub-Minority Spokesperson); Redistricting- Lake & McHenry (Sub-Minority Spokesperson); Redistricting- Northwest Cook (Sub-Minority Spokesperson).

Legislation
In 2016, McConchie sponsored a bill signed into law that expanded voting rights in party primaries for 17-year-olds who would turn 18 by the date of the general election.

In January 2022, McConchie reintroduced four amendments to the Illinois Constitution that he called the "Voter Empowerment Project".  The amendments would change legislative redistricting and make it easier for voters to introduce constitutional amendments, referendums and recalls of elected officials.

Political positions
According to his campaign, McConchie supports reforming the state's pension system. McConchie supports freezing property taxes and opposes increasing taxes. On issues of transportation, McConchie opposes traffic cameras. He supports charter schools and education vouchers. He also supports limits on partisan redistricting, and term limits for legislators.

Personal life
McConchie lives in Hawthorn Woods, Illinois with his wife and two children and is a member of Heritage Church in Lake Zurich. McConchie met his wife in Prague, Czech Republic.

In 2007, McConchie was injured in a motorcycle crash by a hit-and-run driver, forcing him to use a wheelchair.

References

External links
Senator Dan McConchie (R) 26th District at the Illinois General Assembly
By session: 99th, 100th, 101st, 102nd
Constituency Website
Campaign Website

21st-century American politicians
American military police officers
American politicians with disabilities
Central Bible College alumni
Illinois National Guard personnel
Living people
People from Hawthorn Woods, Illinois
Politicians from Chicago
Republican Party Illinois state senators
Trinity Evangelical Divinity School alumni
United States Army soldiers
Year of birth missing (living people)